The Jaleș (also: Sohodol) is a left tributary of the river Tismana in Romania. It flows into the Tismana near Șomănești.

Tributaries

The following rivers are tributaries to the river Jaleș (from source to mouth):

Left: Cotoru, Pescaru, Șteau, Jeleșel, Cățelu, Podu, Grija, Dragomanu, Prajele, Valea Rea, Vârșioru, Tufoaia, Rasova
Right: Albele, Turbanu, Pleșu, Fusteica, Plescioara, Căldări, Runc

See also
Lake Ceauru (project)

References

Rivers of Romania
Rivers of Gorj County